Yahya Amer  is a Saudi Arabian footballer who played as a midfielder for Al-Ahli and represented the Saudi Arabia national team in the 1984 Asian Cup.

Honours
Al-Ahli
Saudi Premier League: 1983–84
King Cup: 1983
Gulf Club Champions Cup: 1985

Saudi Arabia
AFC Asian Cup: 1984

References
Stats

Living people
Sportspeople from Jeddah
Saudi Arabian footballers
Saudi Arabia international footballers
Association football midfielders
1984 AFC Asian Cup players
AFC Asian Cup-winning players
Al-Ahli Saudi FC players
Saudi Professional League players
1960 births